The 404th Maneuver Enhancement Brigade is a maneuver enhancement brigade of the Illinois Army National Guard.

Formerly the 404th Chemical Brigade, this unit is tailored to support the maneuver and security of a Division-level headquarters. The Brigade comprises Engineer, Chemical CBRN, Military Police, Signal and Support units.

The Maneuver Enhancement Brigade (MEB) is a relatively new formation within the US Army. It is primarily designed to provide maneuver support to its assigned headquarters with a mix of technical expertise and combat power. However, the structure of a MEB also makes it ideal for consequence management in response to domestic disasters. The MEB's mix of Chemical, Engineer, and Military Police units provides it with the capability to support governmental organizations in chemical/biological/nuclear decontamination, law enforcement support, or infrastructure repair and restoration.

History
The 404th traces its history to the 404th Chemical Brigade, the first Chemical Brigade activated into the Army National Guard force structure. The 404th Chemical Brigade was formed in 1990 and originally stationed in Rockford, Illinois. It included the 44th Chemical Battalion during that period. The unit subsequently moved to Machesney Park, Illinois where it remained until its deactivation in 1997. In 2001, the 404th was reactivated and stationed in Chicago, Illinois.
In 2009, the 404th began its transformation process to become the 404th Maneuver Enhancement Brigade.

Units
HQ, 404th Maneuver Enhancement Brigade
405th Brigade Support Battalion
 Company A (Distribution)
 Company B (Maintenance)
 406th Signal Company
 33d Military Police Battalion
 233rd Military Police Company
 333d Military Police Company
 933d Military Police Company
 44th Chemical Battalion
 135th Chemical Company
 444th Chemical Company
 445th Chemical Company
 450th Chemical Detachment
 123d Engineer Battalion
 HHC
 Forward Support Company
 631st Engineer Company (Support)
 616th Engineer Detachment (Utilities)
 661st Engineer Company
 615th Engineer Detachment (FFHQ)
 661st Engineer Detachment (FFT)
 662d Engineer Detachment (FFT)
 2118th Engineer Detachment (Asphalt)

See also
Army National Guard
Illinois Army National Guard
Transformation of the United States Army

References

External links
History of the Chemical Brigade
The Institute of Heraldry: 404th Maneuver Enhancement Brigade
Illinois National Guard Homepage

Illinois National Guard units
404
Military units and formations established in 2009